The Somalian slender mongoose (Herpestes ochraceus) is a small mammal found in Somalia and adjacent regions.

It was first described by John Edward Gray in 1848, based on a male brownish yellow mongoose collected in Somalia.

References

Somalian slender mongoose
Mammals of Somalia
Fauna of the Horn of Africa
Somalian slender mongoose
Somalian slender mongoose